The Susan Russell House is a historic house in Somerville, Massachusetts.  The 1.5-story Greek Revival cottage is estimated to have been built in the 1830s, based on a stylistic analysis.  It is a rare survivor of a style that was once common in Somerville.   Greek Revival element is its door surround.  The house was added to the National Register of Historic Places in 1989.

The land on which the Susan Russell House sits was purchased from Oliver Tufts in the early 19th century.

See also
National Register of Historic Places listings in Somerville, Massachusetts

References

Houses on the National Register of Historic Places in Somerville, Massachusetts
Houses completed in 1830
1830 establishments in Massachusetts